Oscoda County is a county in the U.S. state of Michigan. As of the 2020 census, the population was 8,219, making it the least populous county in the Lower Peninsula, and the sixth-least populous county in the entire state. The county seat is Mio, an unincorporated community near the center of the county.

History

The county was established on April 1, 1840 by act of the Michigan State legislature. However, its governing structure was not completed until 1881. The name is a Henry Rowe Schoolcraft neologism, thought to be a combination of two Ojibwa words, "ossin" (stone) and "muskoda" (prairie) -- hence 'pebbly prairie.' He served as the US Indian agent and was also a geographer, surveying and naming newly established counties and towns.

Geography
Oscoda County is part of Northern Michigan.

Geographic features
 Mio is situated in the Au Sable River Valley.
 The County is surrounded by the Huron National Forest and the Rifle River State Recreation Area.
 The County is part of the Au Sable State Forest, specifically the Grayling Fire Management Unit, which consists of Alcona, Crawford, Oscoda, and northern Iosco counties.
 Much of the area sits on the "Grayling outwash plain", a unique habitat.
 The Oscoda County Park offers a good vantage point.
Glaciers shaped the area, creating a unique regional ecosystem. Much of the area is the Grayling outwash plain, a broad outwash plain including sandy ice-disintegration ridges, jack pine barrens, white pine-red pine forest, and northern hardwood forest. Large lakes were created by glacial action.

Major highways
  – runs north–south through the central part of the county. Passes Fairview and Mio.
  – enters west end of county near its central part. Runs east to intersection with M-33 at Mio. Passes Luzerne. It is one of three true cross peninsular highways.
  – runs east from Mio into Alcona County. Passes McKinley.

Adjacent counties

 Montmorency County - north
 Alpena County - northeast
 Alcona County - east
 Iosco County - southeast
 Ogemaw County - south
 Roscommon County - southwest
 Crawford County - west
 Otsego County - northwest

National protected area
 Huron National Forest (part)

Demographics

As of the 2000 United States Census, 9,418 people, 3,921 households, and 2,717 families resided in the county. The population density was 17 people per square mile (6/km2). There were 8,690 housing units at an average density of 15 per square mile (6/km2). The county's racial makeup was 97.82% White, 0.08% Black or African American, 0.71% Native American, 0.07% Asian, 0.01% Pacific Islander, 0.14% from other races, and 1.16% from two or more races. 0.94% of the population were Hispanic or Latino of any race. 30.2% were of German, 12.8% American, 9.6% English, 8.1% Polish, 6.8% French and 6.7% Irish ancestry. 94.1% spoke English, 2.8% German and 1.5% Pennsylvania Dutch as their first language.

There were 3,921 households, out of which 25.30% had children under the age of 18 living with them, 58.10% were married couples living together, 7.50% had a female householder with no husband present, and 30.70% were non-families. 26.00% of all households were made up of individuals, and 12.70% had someone living alone who was 65 years of age or older. The average household size was 2.39 and the average family size was 2.85.

The county population contained 23.30% under the age of 18, 5.60% from 18 to 24, 22.80% from 25 to 44, 28.00% from 45 to 64, and 20.20% who were 65 years of age or older. The median age was 44 years. For every 100 females there were 96.40 males. For every 100 females age 18 and over, there were 95.30 males.

The median income for a household in the county was $28,228, and the median income for a family was $32,225. Males had a median income of $30,013 versus $20,202 for females. The per capita income for the county was $15,697. About 10.30% of families and 14.60% of the population were below the poverty line, including 20.40% of those under age 18 and 8.80% of those age 65 or over.

Government
Oscoda County has been reliably Republican since its organization. Since 1884, the Republican Party nominee has carried the county vote in 85% (29 of 35) of the national elections through 2020.

Oscoda County operates the county jail, maintains rural roads, operates the major local courts, records deeds, mortgages, and vital records, administers public health regulations, and participates with the state in the provision of social services. The county board of commissioners controls the budget and has limited authority to make laws or ordinances. In Michigan, most local government functions – police and fire, building and zoning, tax assessment, street maintenance, etc. – are the responsibility of individual cities and townships.

Elected officials

 Prosecuting Attorney – Kristi Mcgregor
 Sheriff – Kevin R. Grace
 County Clerk/Register of Deeds – Ann Galbraith
 County Treasurer – William Kendall
 Commissioner Dist. 1 – Chuck Varner
 Commissioner Dist. 2 – Tom McCauley
 Commissioner Dist. 3 – Jackie Bondar
 Commissioner Dist. 4 – Flib Flabble
 Commissioner Dist. 5 – Libby Marsh

 current as of January 2022

Recreation
The AuSable River, near Mio, provides opportunity for fishing and canoeing/kayaking/tubing. The M-33 access north of Mio has a launch area and public facilities. A second launch area is at the Mio Dam Pond.

Oscoda County offers snowmobile trails, ATV trails, hiking trails, and cross country skiing trails. Snowmobile and ATV trails are located throughout Luzerne, McKinley, and Mio. There is a scramble area at Bull Gap in the Huron National Forest. The Loud Creek Trail offers 7 different routes with varying difficulty levels. The trail's total distance is 10 kilometers.

In Fairview, there is a horseback riding ranch and a golf course. Karefree Ranch Boarding Stables offers guided horseback rides in Huron National Forest. The Fairview Hills Golf Club is a 9-hole golf course on M-33.

Communities
Oscoda County is the only county in Michigan with no incorporated communities.

Civil townships
 Big Creek Township
 Clinton Township
 Comins Township
 Elmer Township
 Greenwood Township
 Mentor Township

Census-designated place
 Mio (county seat)

Other unincorporated communities
 Biggs Settlement
 Comins
 Fairview
 Kneeland
 Luzerne
 McKinley
 Red Oak

See also
 List of Michigan State Historic Sites in Oscoda County, Michigan
 National Register of Historic Places listings in Oscoda County, Michigan
 Michigan AuSable Valley Railroad

References

External links

 Oscoda County Web Site
 Au Sable Valley connection
 Enchanted forest, Northern Michigan source for information and calendars
 Calendar of Events, Sunrise side
 Sunrise side travel and information

 
Michigan counties
1881 establishments in Michigan
Populated places established in 1881